Dick Moje was an American former professional football defensive end in the National Football League. He played with the Green Bay Packers during the 1951 NFL season and appeared in two games.

Biography 
Moje was born in Los Angeles, California and graduated from Franklin High School (Los Angeles, California). He played college football at Glendale Community College (California) and Loyola Marymount University.  He played one season in the NFL.

References

External links
 Pro-Football-Reference.Com
 The Football Database
 databaseFootball.com

1927 births
1989 deaths
Players of American football from Los Angeles
Green Bay Packers players
Loyola Lions football players
Glendale Vaqueros football players
Franklin High School (Los Angeles) alumni